It Hurts to Be in Love and Eleven More Hit Songs is American singer Gene Pitney's ninth album, released on the Musicor label in the United States in 1964. The album was released as I'm Gonna Be Strong on the Stateside label in the United Kingdom.

The album marked a turning point in Pitney's career with his popularity waning in his home country while rising in Britain. The title track, "It Hurts to Be in Love", and "I'm Gonna Be Strong" were Pitney's last top 10 hits in the United States. The latter single as well as "That Girl Belongs to Yesterday", an early Jagger/Richards composition, were also top 10 hits in the United Kingdom.

The album reached #42 on the US album charts and stayed on the Billboard charts for 17 weeks.

Track listing 
"I'm Gonna Be Strong" (Barry Mann, Cynthia Weil) – 2:12
"Walk" (Helen Miller, Howard Greenfield) – 2:21
"I Love You More Today" (Van McCoy) – 2:18
"Who Needs It" (Len Beadle, Robin Conrad) – 2:08
"Follow the Sun" (Peter Udell, Gary Geld) – 2:28
"Lips Are Redder On You" (Joe Meek) – 2:20
"It Hurts to Be in Love" (Miller, Greenfield) – 2:34
"The Last Two People On Earth" (Bob Brass, Al Kooper, Irwin Levine) – 2:52
"That Girl Belongs to Yesterday" (Mick Jagger, Keith Richards) – 2:51
"E Se Domani" (Carlo Alberto Rossi, Giorgio Calabrese) – 2:48
"Hawaii" (Brass, Kooper, Levine) – 2:08
"I'm Gonna Find Myself a Girl" (Ray Adams, Valerie Avon, Elaine Adams) – 2:39

US Chart History of Singles

References

1964 albums
Gene Pitney albums
Musicor Records albums